In geometry, the order-4 octagonal tiling is a regular tiling of the hyperbolic plane. It has Schläfli symbol of {8,4}. Its checkerboard coloring can be called a octaoctagonal tiling, and Schläfli symbol of r{8,8}.

Uniform constructions 
There are four uniform constructions of this tiling, three of them as constructed by mirror removal from the [8,8] kaleidoscope. Removing the mirror between the order 2 and 4 points, [8,8,1+], gives [(8,8,4)], (*884) symmetry. Removing two mirrors as [8,4*], leaves remaining mirrors *4444 symmetry.

Symmetry 
This tiling represents a hyperbolic kaleidoscope of 8 mirrors meeting as edges of a regular hexagon. This symmetry by orbifold notation is called (*22222222) or (*28) with 8 order-2 mirror intersections. In Coxeter notation can be represented as [8*,4], removing two of three mirrors (passing through the octagon center) in the [8,4] symmetry. Adding a bisecting mirror through 2 vertices of an octagonal fundamental domain defines a trapezohedral *4422 symmetry. Adding 4 bisecting mirrors through the vertices defines *444 symmetry. Adding 4 bisecting mirrors through the edge defines *4222 symmetry. Adding all 8 bisectors leads to full *842 symmetry.

The kaleidoscopic domains can be seen as bicolored octagonal tiling, representing mirror images of the fundamental domain. This coloring represents the uniform tiling r{8,8}, a quasiregular tiling and it can be called a octaoctagonal tiling.

Related polyhedra and tiling 

This tiling is topologically related as a part of sequence of regular tilings with octagonal faces, starting with the octagonal tiling, with Schläfli symbol {8,n}, and Coxeter diagram , progressing to infinity.

This tiling is also topologically related as a part of sequence of regular polyhedra and tilings with four faces per vertex, starting with the octahedron, with Schläfli symbol {n,4}, and Coxeter diagram , with n progressing to infinity.

See also

Square tiling
Tilings of regular polygons
List of uniform planar tilings
List of regular polytopes

References
 John H. Conway, Heidi Burgiel, Chaim Goodman-Strass, The Symmetries of Things 2008,  (Chapter 19, The Hyperbolic Archimedean Tessellations)

External links 

 Hyperbolic and Spherical Tiling Gallery
 KaleidoTile 3: Educational software to create spherical, planar and hyperbolic tilings
 Hyperbolic Planar Tessellations, Don Hatch

Hyperbolic tilings
Isogonal tilings
Isohedral tilings
Order-4 tilings
Regular tilings
Octagonal tilings